Pierangelo Bincoletto (born 14 March 1959) is an Italian former professional racing cyclist. He rode in two editions of the Tour de France and seven editions of the Giro d'Italia. He also competed in two events at the 1980 Summer Olympics.

References

External links
 

1959 births
Living people
Italian male cyclists
People from Oderzo
Cyclists at the 1980 Summer Olympics
Olympic cyclists of Italy
Cyclists from the Province of Treviso